Io e il re (The King and Me) is a 1995 Italian historical comedy drama film written and directed by Lucio Gaudino. It entered the Italian Panorama section at the 52nd Venice International Film Festival.

Cast 

Laura Morante as Beatrice
Franco Nero as  Major Ferri
Carlo Delle Piane as  Victor Emmanuel III of Italy
Carla Calò as  Elena of Montenegro
Philippe Leroy as  Il Conte
Azzurra Fiume Garelli as  Matilde
Maria Monsè as  Maria
Nina Soldano

References

External links

1995 films
Italian comedy-drama films
1995 comedy-drama films
Italian World War II films
1990s Italian films
Cultural depictions of kings